Flacourtia montana  is a plant in the family Salicaceae. It is native to southern Asia. The species presents as a tree up to 20 m in height.

Description 
The tree can attain height about 25 m and girth up to 1.7 m. Tree trunk will be covered with sharp stout thorns at its base. Young parts of the tree is hirsute and young leaves are reddish. Leaves are simple and shows alternate phyllotaxy. Petiole is pubescent with a length of 0.3-0.8 cm. Lamina size: 7-15 × 4-8 cm. Leaf shape is elliptic-oblong with acuminate leaf apex and crenate leaf margin. The leaf is 3-nerved at the base with 4-7 pairs of secondary nerves. Flowers are dioecious, seen in axillary cymes. Fruits are spherical, smooth, scarlet red, with a size of 1-1.5 cm across.

Distribution 
This is a common tree in evergreen and semi-evergreen forests from Matheran to Kanyakumari. The elevation range is 150-1100 m.

Gallery

References

montana